Riley
was a British motorcar and bicycle manufacturer from 1890. Riley became part of the Nuffield Organization in 1938 and was merged into the British Leyland Motor Corporation in 1968. In July 1969 British Leyland announced the immediate end of Riley production, although 1969 was a difficult year for the UK automotive industry and many cars from Riley's inventory may have been first registered in 1970.<ref name=Motor196911>{{cite magazine| first = Harold | last = Hastings| title ='Renowned since '98|magazine=Motor| number = 3515| pages =19–22 |date = 1 November 1969}}</ref>

Today, the Riley trademark is owned by BMW.

Riley Cycle Company

The business began as the Bonnick Cycle Company of Coventry, England. In 1890 during the pedal cycle craze that swept Britain at the end of the 19th century William Riley Jr. who had interests in the textile industry purchased the business and in 1896 incorporated a company to own it named The Riley Cycle Company Limited. Later, cycle gear maker Sturmey Archer was added to the portfolio.  Riley's middle son, Percy, left school in the same year and soon began to dabble in automobiles. He built his first car at 16, in 1898, secretly, because his father did not approve. It featured the first mechanically operated inlet valve. By 1899, Percy Riley moved from producing motorcycles to his first prototype four-wheeled quadricycle.  Little is known about Percy Riley's first "motor-car".  It is, however, well attested that the engine featured mechanically operated cylinder valves at a time when other engines depended on the vacuum effect of the descending piston to suck the inlet valve(s) open.  That was demonstrated some years later when Benz developed and patented a mechanically operated inlet valve process of their own but were unable to collect royalties on their system from British companies; the courts were persuaded that the system used by British auto-makers was based on the one pioneered by Percy, which had comfortably anticipated equivalent developments in Germany.  In 1900, Riley sold a single three-wheeled automobile.  Meanwhile, the elder of the Riley brothers, Victor Riley, although supportive of his brother's embryonic motor-car enterprise, devoted his energies to the core bicycle business.

Riley's founder William Riley remained resolutely opposed to diverting the resources of his bicycle business into motor cars, and in 1902 three of his sons, Victor, Percy and younger brother Allan Riley pooled resources, borrowed a necessary balancing amount from their mother and in 1903 established the separate Riley Engine Company, also in Coventry.  A few years later the other two Riley brothers, Stanley and Cecil, having left school joined their elder brothers in the business.  At first, the Riley Engine Company simply supplied engines for Riley motorcycles and also to Singer, a newly emerging motorcycle manufacturer in the area, but the Riley Engine Company soon began to focus on four-wheeled automobiles. Their Vee-Twin Tourer prototype, produced in 1905, can be considered the first proper Riley car. The Riley Engine Company expanded the next year.  William Riley reversed his former opposition to his sons' preference for motorised vehicles and Riley Cycle halted motorcycle production in 1907 to focus on automobiles. Bicycle production also ceased in 1911.

In 1912, the Riley Cycle Company changed its name to Riley (Coventry) Limited as William Riley focused it on becoming a wire-spoked wheel supplier for the burgeoning motor industry, the detachable wheel having been invented (and patented) by Percy and distributed to over 180 motor manufacturers, and by 1912 the father's business had also dropped automobile manufacture in order to concentrate capacity and resources on the wheels. Exploitation of this new and rapidly expanding lucrative business sector made commercial sense for William Riley, but the abandonment of his motor-bicycle and then of his automobile business which had been the principal customer for his sons' Riley Engine Company enforced a rethink on the engine business.

Riley (Coventry) Limited

In early 1913, Percy was joined by three of his brothers (Victor, Stanley, and Allan) to focus on manufacturing entire automobiles. The works was located near Percy's Riley Engine Company. The first new model, the 17/30, was introduced at the London Motor Show that year. Soon afterwards, Stanley Riley founded yet another business, the Nero Engine Company, to produce his own 4-cylinder 10 hp (7.5 kW) car. Riley also began manufacturing aeroplane engines and became a key supplier in Britain's buildup for World War I.

In 1918, after the war, the Riley companies were restructured. Nero joined Riley (Coventry) as the sole producer of automobiles. Riley Motor Manufacturing under the control of Allan Riley became Midland Motor Bodies, a coachbuilder for Riley. Riley Engine Company continued under Percy as the engine supplier. At this time, Riley's blue diamond badge, designed by Harry Rush, also appeared. The motto was "As old as the industry, as modern as the hour."

Riley grew rapidly through the 1920s and 1930s. The Riley Engine Company produced 4-, 6-, and 8-cylinder engines, while Midland built more than a dozen different bodies. Riley models at this time included:
Saloons: Adelphi, 'Continental'(Close-coupled Touring Saloon), Deauville, Falcon, Kestrel, Mentone, Merlin, Monaco, Stelvio, Victor
Coupes: Ascot, Lincock
Tourers: Alpine, Lynx, Gamecock
Sports: Brooklands, Imp, MPH, Sprite
Limousines: Edinburgh, Winchester

Introduced in 1926 in a humble but innovatively designed fabric bodied saloon, Percy Riley's ground-breaking Riley 9 engine- a small capacity, high revving unit- was ahead of its time in many respects. Having hemispherical combustion chambers and inclined overhead valves, it has been called the most significant engine development of the 1920s. With twin camshafts set high in the cylinder block and valves operated by short pushrods, it provided power and efficiency without the servicing complexity of an OHC (overhead camshaft) layout. It soon attracted the attention of tuners and builders of 'specials' intended for sporting purposes. One such was engineer/driver J.G. Parry-Thomas, who conceived the Riley 'Brooklands' (initially called the '9' Speed Model) in his workshops at the banked Surrey circuit. After Parry-Thomas was killed during a land speed record attempt in 1927, his close collaborator Reid Railton stepped in to finish the job. Officially backed by Riley, the Brooklands, along with later developments and variations such as the 'Ulster' Imp, MPH, and Sprite, proved some of the most successful works and privateer racing cars of the late 1920s and early 1930s. At Le Mans in 1934, Rileys finished 2nd, 3rd, 5th, 6th, and 12th, winning the Rudge-Whitworth Cup, the Team Prize, two class awards, and the Ladies' Prize. Rileys also distinguished themselves at the Ulster TT, at Brooklands itself, and at smaller events like hill climbs, while providing a platform for the success of motorsports' first women racing drivers such as Kay Petre, Dorothy Champney and Joan Richmond.Collection Explorer, National Museum of Australia- Joan Richmond collectionsearch.nma.gov.au, accessed 11 July 2019 Another engineer/driver, Freddie Dixon, was responsible for  extensive improvements to engine and chassis tuning, creating a number of 'specials' that exploited the basic Riley design still further, and contributed greatly to its success on the track.

For series production, the engine configuration was extended into a larger 12 horsepower '4', six-cylinder and even V8 versions, powering an increasingly bewildering range of touring and sports cars. The soundness and longevity of the engine design is illustrated by Mike Hawthorn's early racing success after WW2 in pre-war Rileys, in particular his father's Sprite. By about 1936, however, the business had overextended, with too many models and few common parts, and the emergence of Jaguar at Coventry was a direct challenge. Disagreements between the Riley brothers about the future direction of the enterprise grew. Victor Riley had set up a new ultra-luxury concern, Autovia, to produce a V8 saloon and limousine to compete with Rolls-Royce. By contrast, Percy, however, did not favour an entry into the luxury market, and the Riley Engine Company had been renamed PR Motors to be a high-volume supplier of engines and components. Although the rest of the Riley companies would go on to become part of Nuffield and then BMC, PR Motors remained independent. After the death of Percy Riley in 1941, his business began producing transmission components and still exists today, producing marine and off-highway vehicle applications, as PRM Newage Limited based in Aldermans Green, Coventry. Percy's widow Norah ran his business for many years and was Britain's businesswoman of the year in 1960.

Nuffield Organization

By 1937, Riley began to look to other manufacturers for partnerships. A contract with Briggs Motor Bodies of Dagenham to provide all-steel bodies for a cheaper, more mass-market saloon had already turned sour, with dozens of unsold bodies littering the factory. It had withdrawn from works racing after its most successful year, 1934, although it continued to supply engines for the ERA, a voiturette (Formula 2) racing car based on the supercharged 6-cylinder 'White Riley', developed by ERA founder Raymond Mays in the mid-thirties.  BMW of Munich, Germany was interested in expanding its range into England. But the Riley brothers were more interested in a larger British concern, and looked to Triumph Motor Company, also of Coventry, as a natural fit. In February 1938, all negotiations were suspended. On 24 February the directors placed Riley (Coventry) Limited and Autovia in voluntary receivership. On 10 March the Triumph board announced merger negotiations had been dropped.

It was announced on 9 September 1938 that the assets and goodwill of Riley Motors (Coventry) Limited had been purchased from the receiver by Lord Nuffield and he would on completion transfer ownership to Morris Motors Limited "on terms which will show very considerable financial advantage to the company, resulting in further consolidation of its financial position". Mr Victor Riley then said this did not mean that the company would cease its activities. On 30 September Victor Riley announced that Riley (Coventry) Limited would be wound up but it would appear that the proceeds of liquidation would be insufficient to meet the amount due to debenture holders.Riley Motors Limited, Company no. 00344156 was incorporated 8 September 1938—and changed its name in 1994 to BLMC Engineering Limited. Curiously the name Riley (Coventry) Limited continued to be used in all Nuffield group advertising until 1946 as if the original company had not been liquidated but continued to survive.Riley Motors Limited was used in all advertising between 1950 and July 1960 Nuffield paid £143,000 for the business and a new company was formed, Riley Motors Limited. However, in spite of the announced intention to wind-up Riley (Coventry) Limited, perhaps for tax reasons, continued under the management of Victor Riley presumably with the necessary consents of debenture holders (part paid) creditors (nothing) and former shareholders (nothing). Nuffield passed ownership to his Morris Motors Limited for £100. Along with other Morris Motors subsidiaries Wolseley and MG, Riley would later be promoted as a member of the Nuffield Organization. Riley Motors Limited seems to have begun trading at the end of the 1940s when Riley (Coventry) Limited disappeared..

Nuffield took quick measures to firm up the Riley business. Autovia was no more, with just 35 cars having been produced. Riley refocused on the 4-cylinder market with two engines: A 1.5-litre 12 hp engine and the "Big Four", a 2.5-litre 16 hp unit (The hp figures are RAC Rating, and bear no relationship to bhp or kW). Only a few bodies were produced prior to the onset of war in 1939, and some components were shared with Morris for economies of scale. Though they incorporated a number of mechanical improvements- notably a Nuffield synchromesh gearbox- they were essentially interim models, suffering a loss of Riley character in the process. The new management responded to the concerns of the marque's loyal adherents by re-introducing the Kestrel 2.5 litre Sports Saloon in updated form, but as the factory was turned over to wartime production this was a short-lived development.

After World War II, Riley took up the old engines in new models, based in concept on the 1936-8 'Continental', a fashionable 'notchback' design whose name had been changed prior to release to 'Close-Coupled Touring Saloon' owing to feared objections from Rolls-Royce.  The RMA used the 1.5-litre engine, while the RMB got the Big Four. Both engines, being derived from pre-war models, lent themselves as power units for specials and new specialist manufacturers, such as Donald Healey.The RM line of vehicles, sold under the "Magnificent Motoring" tag line, were to be a re-affirmation of Riley values in both road behaviour and appearance.   'Torsionic' front independent suspension and steering design inspired by the Citroën Traction Avant provided precise handling; their flowing lines were particularly well-balanced, marrying pre-war 'coachbuilt' elegance to more modern features, such as headlamps faired into the front wings. The RMC, a 3-seater roadster was an unsuccessful attempt to break into the American market, while the RMD was an elegant 4/5-seater two-door drophead, of which again few were made.  The 1.5-litre RME and 2.5-litre RMF were later developments of the saloon versions, which continued in production into the mid-fifties.

Victor Riley was removed by Nuffield in 1947. In early 1949 the Coventry works were made an extension of Morris Motors' engine branch. Riley production was consolidated with MG at Abingdon. Wolseley production was moved to Cowley. Nuffield's marques were then organised in a similar way to those of General Motors: Morris was the value line, and Wolseley the luxury marque. Aside from their small saloons MG largely offered spartan performance, especially with their open sports cars, while Riley sought to be both sporty and luxurious. With Wolseley also fighting for the top position, however, the range was crowded and confused.

British Motor Corporation

The confusion became critical in 1952 with the merger of Nuffield and Austin as the British Motor Corporation. Now, Riley was positioned between MG and Wolseley and most Riley models would become, like those, little more than badge-engineered versions of Austin/Morris designs.

The first all-new Riley under BMC, however, was designated the RMH, and because of its distinctive engine and suspension design, has been called 'the last real Riley'. This was the Pathfinder, with Riley's familiar 2.5-litre four developed to produce 110 bhp. (The RMG 'Wayfarer', a projected 1.5-litre version, was rejected as underpowered). The Pathfinder body was later reworked and, with a different engine and rear suspension, sold as the Wolseley 6/90. The Riley lost its distinct (though externally subtle) differences in 1958, and the 6/90 of that year was available badge engineered as a Riley Two-Point-Six. Although this was the only postwar 6-cylinder Riley, its C-Series engine was actually less powerful than the Riley Big Four that it replaced. This was to be the last large Riley, with the model dropped in May 1959 and Riley refocusing on the under-2-litre segment.

Riley and Wolseley were linked in small cars as well. Launched in 1957, the Riley One-Point-Five and Wolseley 1500 were based on the unused but intended replacement for the Morris Minor. They shared their exteriors, but the Riley was marketed as the more performance-oriented option, having an uprated engine, twin S.U. carburetters and a close-ratio gearbox. With its good handling, compact, sports-saloon styling and well-appointed interior, the One-Point-Five quite successfully recaptured the character of the 1930s light saloons.

At the top of the Riley line for April 1959 was the new Riley 4/Sixty-Eight saloon. Again, it was merely a badge-engineered version of other BMC models. The steering was perhaps the worst feature of the car, being Austin-derived cam and peg rather than the rack and pinion of the One-Point-Five. Overall, it could not provide the sharp and positive drive associated with previous Rileys, being based on the humble Austin Cambridge and Morris Oxford. Sharing many features with the similarly upmarket MG Magnette Mark III and Wolseley 15/60, it was the most luxurious of the versions,  which were all comfortable and spacious, and (nominally) styled by Farina.  The car was refreshed, along with its siblings, in 1961 and rebadged the 4/Seventy-Two.

The early 1960s also saw the introduction of the Riley Elf based on the original Mini. Again, a Wolseley model (the Hornet) was introduced simultaneously. This time, the Riley and Wolseley versions were differentiated visually by their grilles but identical mechanically.

The final model of the BMC era was the Kestrel 1100/1300, based on the Austin/Morris 1100/1300 saloon (BMC ADO16). This also had stablemates in Wolseley and MG versions. Following objections from diehard Riley enthusiasts, the Kestrel name was dropped for the last facelift in 1968, the Riley 1300.

Between 1966 and 1968, a series of mergers took place in the British motor industry, ultimately creating the British Leyland Motor Corporation, whose management embarked on a programme of rationalisation—in which the Riley marque was an early casualty. The badge began to be discontinued in many export markets almost immediately. A BLMC press release was reported in The Times of 9 July 1969: "British Leyland will stop making Riley cars from today. "With less than 1 per cent of the home market, they are not viable" the company said last night. The decision will end 60 years of motoring history. No other marques in the British Leyland stable are likely to suffer the same fate "in the foreseeable future".

In spite of the decline of the marque under BMC, surviving well-preserved examples of the period are now considered desirable classics, the Riley 'face' and badge lending a distinctive character. The needs of enthusiasts are met by the Riley Motor Club, the original factory Club founded in 1925.

The future
Riley production ended with the 1960s, and the marque became dormant. The last Riley badged car was produced in 1969. For many enthusiasts, however, the name of Riley still has resonance into the 21st century. Many of the original racing Rileys compete regularly in VSCC (Vintage Sports Car Club) events, and pre-war racing 'specials' continue to be created (controversially) from tired or derelict saloons. For a short while, following BMW's purchase of the Rover Group in 1994, there were hopes that Riley might be revived, since the then Chairman Bernd Pischetsrieder was an enthusiast for many of the defunct British marques.  After Pischetsrieder's removal in 1999, and BMW's divestment of the MG Rover Group in 2000, however, these hopes faded; though the rights to the Triumph and Riley marques, along with Mini were retained by BMW.

In 2007, William Riley, who claims to be a descendant of the Riley family, although this has been disputed, formed MG Sports and Racing Europe Ltd. This new business acquired assets relating to the MG XPower SV sportscar from PricewaterhouseCoopers, the administrators of the defunct MG Rover Group, and intended to continue production of the model as the MG XPower WR.

In September 2010 the motor magazine 'Autocar' reported that BMW were considering the revival of the Riley brand in the form of a variant of the redesigned MINI. This would most likely be a luxury version taking its cues from the 'Elf' of 1961–9, with a 'notchback' (booted) body, and the interior trimmed in wood and leather in the manner of earlier Rileys.  No sources were quoted, however, and in the absence of any statement from BMW reports of the possible resurrection of Riley must be regarded as highly speculative. Autocar'' reiterated this information in April 2016.

List of Riley vehicles

Pre-World War I
1907–1911 Riley 9
1907–1907 Riley 12
1909–1914 Riley 10
1908–1914 Riley 12/18
1915–1916 Riley 10

Inter-war years
1913–1922 Riley 17/30
1919–1924 Riley Eleven
1925–1928 Riley Twelve
1926–1937 Riley Nine
1929–1934 Riley 14/6
1933–1935 Riley 12/6
1935–1935 Riley 12/4
1935–1938 Riley 15/6
1935–1938 Riley 1½-litre
1936–1938 Riley 8/90 V8
1937–1940 Riley 16
1938–1938 Riley Victor
1939–1940 Riley 12 Nuffield body

Notable bodies
1927–1931 Riley Brooklands Nine
1934–1935 Riley Imp Nine
1934–1935 Riley MPH 12/6 14/6 or 15/6
1936–1938 Riley Sprite 12/4 1½ litre

Post-war
Roadster
 1948–1951 RMC
 1949–1951 RMD
Mid-sized
 1945–1952 RMA
 1952–1955 RME
 1957–1965 One-Point-Five (Wolseley 1500)
 1959–1961 4/Sixty-Eight (Wolseley 15/60)
 1961–1969 4/Seventy-Two (Wolseley 16/60)
Large
 1946–1952 RMB
 1952–1953 RMF
 1953–1957 Pathfinder
 1958–1959 Two-Point-Six (Wolseley 6/90)
Mini
 1961–1969 Riley Elf (Mini variant)
Compact
 1965–1969 Riley Kestrel (variant of the Austin/Morris 1100/1300)

See also
 List of car manufacturers of the United Kingdom
1936 Benalla Centenary Race

Notes

References

External links

 Brochures (incomplete)
1930 Riley Nine

1937 Riley Motors

 Riley 12-18 tourer 1909
  The Riley RM Club - The Club for the Preservation of all Rileys from 1945-1957
 Riley Motor Club 'The Club for all Rileys'
 The 1100 Club based in the UK
 Austin and Longbridge All about the history of Longbridge and models produced

Coventry motor companies
Defunct cycle manufacturers of the United Kingdom
Defunct motor vehicle manufacturers of England
Vehicle manufacturing companies established in 1890
Manufacturing companies disestablished in 1938
1890 establishments in England
1938 disestablishments in England
British Leyland
BMW
Luxury motor vehicle manufacturers
1938 mergers and acquisitions
British companies disestablished in 1938
British companies established in 1890
Sports car manufacturers